The following lists events that happened during 1905 in South Africa.

Incumbents
 Governor of the Cape of Good Hope and High Commissioner for Southern Africa:Walter Hely-Hutchinson.
 Governor of the Colony of Natal: Henry Edward McCallum.
 Prime Minister of the Cape of Good Hope: Leander Starr Jameson.
 Prime Minister of the Orange River Colony: Alfred Milner (until 7 June), William Palmer, 2nd Earl of Selborne (starting 7 June).
 Prime Minister of the Colony of Natal: George Morris Sutton (until 16 May), Charles John Smythe (starting 16 May).

Events
January

Unknown date
 Non-whites are not given voting rights, except in the Cape Colony.
 The Cape Town City Hall in Darling Street is built.

Births
 3 February – Herman Charles Bosman, writer and journalist, is born at Kuilsrivier, Cape Town. (d. 1951)
 8 April – Helen Joseph, activist, is born in Sussex, England. (d. 1992)
 5 July – Jock Cameron, cricketer. (d. 1935)
 9 August – Moses Kotane, anti-apartheid activist. (d. 1978)
 2 September – Harry Hart, athlete. (d. 1979)
 4 September – Eileen Mary Challans, writer is born in Essex, England. (d. 1983)

Deaths
 18 April – Enoch Sontonga, composer of Nkosi Sikelel' iAfrika, dies at age 32.

Railways

Railway lines opened
 1 February – Free State – Springfontein to Jagersfontein, .
 1 March – Free State – Aberfeldy to Bethlehem, .
 27 March – Transvaal – Rayton to Cullinan, .
 1 May – Cape Western – Hutchinson to Pampoenpoort, .
 18 May – Cape Eastern – Xalanga to Elliot, .
 1 August – Transvaal – Klerksdorp to Vierfontein (Free State), .
 19 September – Cape Western – De Aar to Prieska, .
 1 November – Cape Eastern – Komga to Eagle, .
 1 November – Cape Midland – Humewood Road to Humansdorp (Narrow gauge), .
 1 November – Natal – Elandskop to Donnybrook, .
 2 November – Cape Eastern – Aliwal North to Lady Grey, .
 1 December – Cape Western – Cape Town to Sea Point, .
 16 December – Cape Western – Van der Stel to Strand, .
 16 December – Free State – Modderpoort to Ladybrand, .

 18 December – Free State – Marseilles to Maseru in Basutoland, .
 20 December – Transvaal – Springs to Breyten, .
 22 December – Free State – Dover to Parys, .

Locomotives
Cape
 A single 0-4-2 tank locomotive named Britannia is placed in service by the Cape Copper Company as a shunting engine at Port Nolloth in the Cape Colony.

Natal
 The Natal Government Railways places two Class A  Pacific locomotives in service, designed by Locomotive Superintendent D.A. Hendrie for passenger traffic on the mainline between Ladysmith and Charlestown. In 1912 they will be designated Class 2 on the South African Railways (SAR).

Transvaal
 The Central South African Railways places two four-cylinder rack tank steam locomotives in service on the section between Waterval Onder and Waterval Boven, but they are underpowered and prove to be failures in rack service.

References

 
South Africa
Years in South Africa